The Federalists are an American rock band based in the San Francisco Bay Area. The band was formed in September 2005 when singer-songwriter Luke Franks decided to piece together a band to perform the songs he had been working on independently. He asked drummer Dustin Smith, and bass player Brandt Walker (from Franks' previous band Yours Truly). The Federalists have released three studio albums.

The Federalists' music has been inspired by a wide variety of artists and styles, including Wilco, Bob Dylan and The Beatles. Their music has been called everything from indie to classic rock, alt. country, and classic pop.

In 2008, with the release of their second full length Self-Titled record, The Federalists received numerous music reviews by local and nationally respected indie press including; Diablo Magazine, The Big Takeover, Recording Magazine, East Bay Express, and Performer Magazine.  The single from their 2008 record, 'City Girl', received support from Bay Area radio stations such as; LIVE 105, KFOG, and 107.7 The Bone.  LIVE 105 music director Aaron Axelsen was so impressed by The Federalists second record he asked them to play at BFD, LIVE 105's annual music festival at the Shoreline Amphitheater in June 2008.  This started a progression of great show offers for The Federalists in the remainder of 2008. The Federalists provided the main support for Or, The Whale at Great American Music Hall in San Francisco and opened for Santana at the Sleep Train Pavilion in Concord, California.

Discography

Full length albums
The Federalists(2006)—released July 1, 2006
The Federalists (2008)—released February 12, 2008
The Way We Ran—released November 3, 2009

EPs
12 Galaxies EP (2007)—Released January 20, 2007

Compilations
Red House Studios - Guitars Not Guns Compilation Vol.1 - Never Saw It Coming—Released October 29, 2006
A Foggy Holiday - Vol. 2 - Christmas (Baby, Please Come Home)—Released November 18, 2008

Members
Luke Franks - vocals, guitar (2005–present)
Dustin Smith - drums (2005–present)
Brandt Walker - bass (2005–present)
Jason Roysdon - guitar (2005-present)
Clark Abbott - guitar, vocals (2008–present)
Chris Cooper - keys (2008–present)

External links
Official Website
Talking House Records
 Official Myspace

References

Indie rock musical groups from California
Musical groups from the San Francisco Bay Area